Hesa Air Base  belongs to the Iran's Aircraft Manufacturing Industrial Company HESA and it has been built near of Esfahan.

References

Buildings and structures in Isfahan Province